"The Raid" is a short story by Russian author Leo Tolstoy, first published in 1853.  The story, set in the Caucasus, takes the form of a conversation between the narrator and a military captain about the nature of bravery.  The story is based on Tolstoy's own experiences as an artillery cadet stationed in the Caucasus.

See also
Leo Tolstoy bibliography

References

1853 short stories
Short stories by Leo Tolstoy
Russian short stories
Caucasus in fiction